Mark Philip Lavender (born 28 August 1967) is an Australian cricketer, who played for Western Australia between 1990 and 1998.

Early career
Lavender was born to Anglo-Indian parents in Madras, India, and moved to Australia at an early age. He attended the Western Australian Institute of Sport (WAIS) and represented the Western Australia Under-19s, Western Australia Colts and Western Australia Second XI teams. He also played grade cricket for Mount Lawley.

Western Australia career
He made his first-class debut for Western Australia against Victoria on 15 February 1991, at the St. Kilda Cricket Ground, scoring 118 runs on debut before being dismissed by Paul Reiffel. He made his List A debut for Western Australia against Tasmania on 11 October 1991, at the WACA Ground.

In total, Lavender played 53 first-class matches, scoring 3102 runs at an average of 34.08 with a highest score of 173* achieved against New South Wales . He also played 30 List A matches, all for Western Australia, making 931 runs at an average of 35.80, with a highest score of 100.

Lavender also played one match for the MCC against Pakistan A at Denis Compton Oval during the 1997 season. He made 0 and 6* and took three catches.

See also
 List of Western Australia first-class cricketers

References

External links
Cricinfo Profile
CricketArchive Profile

1967 births
Australian cricketers
Indian emigrants to Australia
Australian people of Anglo-Indian descent
Australian sportspeople of Indian descent
Anglo-Indian people
Living people
Marylebone Cricket Club cricketers
Cricketers from Chennai
Western Australia cricketers
Western Australian Institute of Sport alumni